Robert Keller may refer to:

 Robert Keller (botanist) (1854–1939), Swiss botanist
 Robert Keller (music editor) (1828–1891), German music editor
 Robert J. Keller (1893–?), member of the Wisconsin State Assembly
 Robert P. Keller (1920–2010), general in the Marine Corps